Senator Hillman may refer to:

Earle M. Hillman (1902–1975), Maine State Senate
Mark Hillman (fl. 1980s–2000s), Colorado State Senate